The Somali striped mole rat (Fukomys ilariae) is a species of small mole rat that is endemic to Africa.

References

Endemic fauna of Somalia
Fukomys
Mammals described in 2011
Species known from a single specimen